

Świdwin County is a unit of territorial administration and local government (powiat) in West Pomeranian Voivodeship, north-western Poland. It came into being on January 1, 1999, as a result of the Polish local government reforms passed in 1998.

As of 2012 its total population is 49,181.

Neighbouring counties
Świdwin County is bordered by Kołobrzeg County and Białogard County to the north, Szczecinek County to the east, and Drawsko County and Łobez County to the south.

Administrative division
The county is subdivided into six gminas (one urban, one urban-rural and four rural). These are listed in the following table, in descending order of population.

References

Notes

Polish official population figures 2006

 
Land counties of West Pomeranian Voivodeship